Miss Universe Australia 2020 was the 16th edition of the Miss Universe Australia pageant held on 28 October 2020 at Sofitel Melbourne on Collins, Melbourne, Victoria. Finals was originally scheduled for 25 June 2020, but was postponed to 28 October 2020 due to COVID-19 pandemic. 

Priya Serrao of Victoria crowned Maria Thattil of Victoria at the end of the event. Thattil represented Australia at Miss Universe 2020 in Florida, and placed in the Top 10.

Final results

Special awards

Delegates

References

External links
Official Website

2020
2020 beauty pageants
Events postponed due to the COVID-19 pandemic